Jay Laurence Lush (January 3, 1896 – May 22, 1982) was a pioneering animal geneticist who made important contributions to livestock breeding. He is sometimes known as the father of modern scientific animal breeding. Lush received National Medal of Science in 1968 and the Wolf Prize in 1979.

Lush was introduced to mathematics and genetics during his BSc studies of animal husbandry at the Kansas State Agricultural College (now Kansas State University). He completed his MSc in 1918 at Kansas State, and his PhD in genetics at the University of Wisconsin–Madison (1922).

Lush advocated breeding not based on subjective appearance of the animal, but on quantitative statistics and genetic information. Lush authored a classic textbook Animal Breeding Plans in 1937 which greatly influenced animal breeding around the world.

From 1930 to 1966, Lush was the Charles  F. Curtiss  Distinguished Professor in Agriculture at Iowa State University. He was elected to the United States National Academy of Sciences in 1967.

Lush won the Borden  Award for  research  in  dairy production from the American Dairy Science Association and both the Armour Award for  animal  breeding  and  genetics and the Morrison Award from the American Society of Animal Science. In 1979, he was awarded the Wolf Prize in Agriculture.

Bibliography

References

1896 births
1982 deaths
American geneticists
Iowa State University faculty
Kansas State University alumni
University of Wisconsin–Madison College of Agricultural and Life Sciences alumni
Members of the United States National Academy of Sciences
National Medal of Science laureates
Wolf Prize in Agriculture laureates
People from Page County, Iowa